Sir Ab (also Romanized as Sīr Āb) is a village in Kharaqan-e Sharqi Rural District, Abgarm District, Avaj County, Qazvin Province, Iran. At the 2006 census, its population was 260, in 68 families.

References 

Populated places in Avaj County